The 2015 Summer Universiade was a Universiade held in the city of Gwangju, South Korea. It took place from July 3 to July 14, 2015.

The event is officially known as the XXVIII Summer Universiade and also known as Gwangju 2015.

Bid selection
The cities of Edmonton, Alberta, Canada; Taipei, Taiwan; and Gwangju, South Korea were in contention for the Games.  On May 23, 2009, FISU awarded the hosting rights to Gwangju.

Venues

Gwangju
 Gwangju Universiade Main Stadium: ceremonies, athletics
 Dongkang College Gymnasium: basketball
 Yeomju Gymnasium: volleyball
 Nambu University International Aquatics Center: swimming, diving
 Yeomju Indoor Aquatics Center: water polo
 Yeomju Bitgoeul Gymnasium: judo
 Gwangju Women's University Universiade Gymnasium: gymnastics
 Honam University Football Field: football
 Jinwol International Tennis Court: tennis
 Yeomju Indoor Tennis Court: tennis
 Kim Dae-Jung Convention Center: fencing
 Gwangju KIA Champions Field: baseball
 Mudeung Baseball Stadium: baseball
 Gwangju International Archery Center: archery
 Chosun University Gymnasium: taekwondo
 Honam University Gymnasium: volleyball
 Gwangju University Gymnasium: basketball

South Jeolla (Jeonnam)

Boseong
 Boseong Public Stadium: football

Gurye
 Gurye Indoor Gymnasium: handball

Hwasun
 Hwasun Hanium Culture Sports Center: badminton

Jangseong
 Jangseong Hong Gil-Dong Gymnasium: table tennis
 Jangseong Lake : swimming

Mokpo
 Mokpo International Football Center: football

Muan
 Muan Indoor Stadium: basketball

Naju
 Dongshin University Gymnasium: volleyball
 Naju Public Stadium: football
 Naju Gold Lake Country Club: golf
 Naju, South Jeolla Province Shooting Range: shooting
 Naju Indoor Stadium: handball

Suncheon
 Palma Gymnasium: volleyball

Yeonggwang
 Yeonggwang Sportium Gymnasium: basketball
 Yeonggwang Sportium Football Field: football

North Jeolla (Jeonbuk)

Gochang
 Gochang County Gymnasium: handball
 Gochang Public Stadium: football

Jeongeup
 Jeongeup Public Stadium: football

North Chungcheong (Chungbuk)

Chungju
 Tangeum Lake: rowing

Identity

Mascot

The official mascot of the 2015 Summer Universiade is an angel of light named Nuribi. The name Nuribi is a combination of the Korean words ‘nuri’ for world and ‘bi’ for fly. It is described as the messenger of light, symbol of Gwangju Universiade vision and bridge of communication of world's youth which spreads hope of creation to deliver light to the world.

Slogan
The slogan of the 2015 Summer Universiade is "Light Up Tomorrow" which represents the city’s identity derived from its name Gwangju, the town of light, its position at the center of 21st-century high-tech industry era, the challenging spirit and passion of the world’s youth especially university student athlete at the Universiade, expectations for better performance of athlete, Gwangju’s effort to help brighten the future of the world through the Universiade, city’s intention to create momentum for sustainable development toward a better future, and will of Guangju to set new standards for universiade.

Logo
The logo of the 2015 Summer Universiade is the "Wings of Light". Its unique 'U' letter shape resembles the Universiade Games. Overall, it represents the passion of athletes compete against all odds beyond limits, the dynamic atmosphere of sport, and the harmony of nations around the world, and Gwangju's vision to reach worldwide recognition and admiration. 5 blue wings represents the world's oceans and 6 Red wings represents the world's six continents. The overlapping light denotes the harmony and friendship among the world’s youth especially university student athlete in the Universiade. The soaring U-shaped wings emitting light symbolize Gwangju as a global city and aiming for greater heights during the universiade.

Sports

 Aquatics
 
 
 
 
 
 
 
 
 
 
 
 
 Artistic gymnastics (14)
 Rhythmic gymnastics (8)

Participants

  (3)
  (34)
  (1)
  (2)
  (81)
  (12)
  (2)
  (180)
  (25)
  (8)
  (2)
  (2)
  (22)
  (35)
  (2)
  (8)
  
  (16)
  (199)
  (4)
  (2)
  (2)
  (12)
  (232)
  (1)
  (72)
  (370)
  (56)
  (2)
  (2)
  (23)
  (2)
  
  (19)
  (145)
  (22)
  (2)
  (10)
  (1)
  (2)
  
  (85)
  (2)
  (78)
  (224)
  (5)
  (1)
  
  (115)
  (17)
  (3)
  (1)
  (79)
  (117)
  (98)
  (40)
  (84)
  (64)
  (27)
  (205)
  
  (10)
  (350)
  (22)
  (94)
  (9)
  (379) (host)
  (21)
  (46)
  (52)
  (1)
  (1)
  (71)
  (10)
  
  (2)
  (107)
  (10)
  (11)
  (2)
  (170)
  (1)
  
  (1)
  (99)
  (33)
  (12)
  (24)
  (1)
  (22)
  (58)
  (66)
  (2)
  (51)
  
  (53)
  (33)
  (8)
  (2)
  (7)
  (3)
  (1)
  (78)
  (153)
  (45)
  (17)
  (58)
  (453)  (top) 
  (2)
  (7)
  (92)
  (16)
  (18)
  (50)
  (45)
  (2)
  (111)
  (17)
  (54)
  (2)
  (2)
  (80)
  (103)
   Chinese Taipei (234)
  (8)
  (2)
  (107)
  
  (2)
  (112)
  (33)
  (134)
  (64)
  (373)
  (39)
  (34)
  (92)
  (6)
  
  (8)
  (23)

Schedule

Medal table

See also
 Sport in South Korea

References

External links
Official Games site

 
Summer World University Games
Multi-sport events in South Korea
Sports competitions in Gwangju
U
Summer Universiade, 2015
Universiade Summer
Summer Universiade
Summer Universiade